Dan Hirschhorn is an American national political journalist, who currently serves as senior politics editor and a deputy news editor at The Philadelphia Inquirer. He has previously served as director of news at Time, Inc. and Time.com.

Hirschhorn attended Brandeis University, where he was editor-in-chief of the Brandeis independent student newspaper, The Justice. Following graduation, he worked as a journalist for The Bulletin in Philadelphia. He was the "Philly-based half" of PolitickerPA, a political news website operated by The New York Observer media company.

Hirschhorn also founded pa2010.com, a website dedicated to the 2010 election cycle in Pennsylvania, and worked at Politico.

External links
"Dan Hirschhorn". Politico
About pa2010.com

References

Living people
Writers from Philadelphia
American newspaper reporters and correspondents
Pennsylvania political journalists
Brandeis University alumni
Year of birth missing (living people)